The Orlando Predators are a professional indoor football team based in Orlando, Florida, with home games at the Amway Center and is a member of the National Arena League. They played their first season in 2019 and are marketed as a revival of the Orlando Predators, who played 25 seasons in the Arena Football League from 1991 to 2016. The original owners of the NAL team acquired the Predators' trademarks in late 2018 after the previous owner, David A. Siegel, allowed them to lapse.

History
The relaunch of the Orlando Predators was announced in January 2019 and was owned by Kenny McEntyre and Nate Starling after acquiring the trademarks for the team in late 2018. McEntyre and inaugural head coach Doug Miller were both former players with the AFL incarnation of the team. In their inaugural 2019 season, the team finished with a 2–12 record and last place in the league. During the season, players claimed the team was poorly operated including failed payments and evictions from team housing.

Prior to the team's second season, the ownership of the Predators were removed by the league and replaced by another local ownership group composed of co-owner Nate Starling and the Trideco family. The new ownership group brought in former AFL Predator Ben Bennett as head coach. The 2020 season never took place due to the onset of the COVID-19 pandemic.

On May 21, 2021, the team announced the Trideco family's minority ownership had been purchased by John Cheney, allowing the Trideco family to focus on launching the expansion Albany Empire. Under Bennett, the team went 4–4 and qualified for the playoffs for the first time. Bennett left the team following the season was replaced by Jeff Higgins.

On September 16, 2022, the Predators announced veteran player Herkie Walls as their new head coach.

Current roster

Statistics

Season-by-season results

Head coaches
Note: Statistics are correct through the 2022 National Arena League season.

References

External links
 Official website

National Arena League teams
2019 establishments in Florida
American football teams in Orlando, Florida
American football teams established in 2019